Nemška Vas is a village in the Municipality of Ribnica in southern Slovenia. It lies south of the town of Ribnica on the main road to Dolenja Vas. The area is part of the traditional region of Lower Carniola and is now included in the Southeast Slovenia Statistical Region.

Name
Both the Slovene and German names of the village mean 'German village', referring to a settlement of ethnic Germans in what was otherwise Slovene ethnic territory.

Church
The local church, built east of the village, is dedicated to Saint Leonard and belongs to the Parish of Ribnica. It was built in 1843 on the site of a 14th-century church.

References

External links
Nemška Vas on Geopedia

Populated places in the Municipality of Ribnica